James Davies may refer to:

Sports
 James Davies (footballer, born 1845) (1845–c. 1910), Wrexham F.C. and Wales footballer
 James Davies (cyclist, born 1906) (1906–1999), Canadian Olympic cyclist
 James Davies (cyclist, born 1934), Canadian Olympic cyclist
 James Davies (jockey), European steeplechase rider in the 2007 Cheltenham Gold Cup
 Jamie Davies (born 1974), English racing driver
 Jim Davies (rugby) (c. 1886-?), Welsh rugby union, and rugby league footballer of the 1900s, 1910s and 1920s, and rugby league coach of the 1920s
 James Davies (rugby union) (born 1990), Welsh rugby union footballer of the 2010s
 James Davies (Australian footballer) (born 1982), Australian rules footballer

Military
 James Llewellyn Davies (1886–1917), Welsh recipient of the Victoria Cross
 Jimmy Davies (RAF officer) (1913–1940), first American airman killed in World War II combat

Politics
 James J. Davis (1873–1947), born James John Davies, American politician
 James Davies (politician) (born 1980), British politician

Other
 James Kitchener Davies (1902–1952), Welsh-language writer
 James Chowning Davies (1918–2012), American sociologist and professor of political science
 James Conway Davies (1891–1971), Welsh historian and palaeographer
 James Davies (Iago ap Dewi) (1800–1869), Welsh poet and printer
 James Davies (Baptist minister) (1767–1860), Welsh Baptist minister
 James Davies (schoolmaster) (1765–1849), Welsh schoolmaster
 James Davies (headmaster) (1820–1883), English classical scholar and cleric
 James Eirian Davies (1918–1998), Welsh poet and Methodist minister
 James Davies (psychologist) (1973), British sociologist and psychologist.

See also 
 Jimmy Davies (disambiguation)
 Jim Davies (disambiguation)
 Jimmy Davies, an American racecar driver in Champ cars, and midgets
 James Davis (disambiguation)